The DARD 120 is a shoulder-launched missile launcher of French origin manufactured by Societe Europeenne de Propulsion (SEP).

Work on the new grenade launcher przeciwpancernym started in Societe Europeenne de Propulsion in 1978 year. It had a construction similar to that have been operated LRAC F1, but greater penetration. The outcome was a grenade Dard 90, also known as AC 1000. It did przebijalności required, so it was decided to increase the caliber of 95 mm. In 1979, the work was stopped on the AC 1000 and began work on a 120 mm caliber grenade launcher. The result was presented in the 1981 grenade year Dard 120 (presented at the same time competing launchers APILAS and Jupiter 300 ).

Overview
The DARD 120 was designed in France for use by the infantryman of the French Army. It fires a  projectile at high speed and is a very accurate weapon.

The DARD 120 uses a split breechblock system. The weapon is made up of two parts, a disposable pre-loaded launch tube clips onto a reusable firing device. It is capable of penetrating  of steel armor. With optional night vision sights and an operating temperature range between -22 and 122 degrees Fahrenheit (-30 and 50 degrees Celsius), the DARD is a versatile weapon that can be used in desert as well as arctic conditions.

References

Anti-tank rockets
Cold War weapons of France
Nexter Systems
Military equipment introduced in the 1970s